The Demino Ski Marathon is a cross-country skiing marathon in Russia. It has been held since 2007 and was appointed as a Worldloppet event in June 2012. It is the most popular ski race in Russia (1402 participants in 2015).

The Demino Ski Marathon has been a member of the Russialoppet since 2008.

The main distance is 50 km free style, in one or two laps. The race is held on Ski Center Demino, near Rybinsk city. The ski marathon is a part of the Demino Cup, which includes also a cross-country cycling marathon and running half-marathon.

The only time the marathon has  been cancelled was in 2014 due to lack of snow.

Winners

References

External links

 Official website 
 Demino Marathon at worldloppet site

2007 establishments in Russia
March sporting events
Recurring sporting events established in 2007
Ski marathons
Cross-country skiing competitions in Russia